Historical thinking is a set of critical literacy skills for evaluating and analyzing primary source documents to construct a meaningful account of the past. A large-scale experiment in San Francisco high schools compared traditional textbook-driven instruction to instruction focusing on the analysis of primary source documents. After six months, students in experimental classrooms improved in historical thinking as well as reading comprehension compared to students in regular classrooms.

Sometimes called historical reasoning skills, historical thinking skills are frequently described in contrast to history content such as names, dates, and places. This dichotomous presentation is often misinterpreted as a claim for the superiority of one form of knowing over the other. In fact, the distinction is generally made to underscore the importance of developing thinking skills that can be applied when individuals encounter any history content. Most educators agree that together, history content—or facts about the past—and historical thinking skills enable students to interpret, analyze and use information about past events. In doing so, students will realize the complexity of history with all of the pieces and perspectives that cannot be captured through one narrative. Furthermore, as described by T. Mills Kelly, characteristics of historical thinking develop sourcing skills, the ability to construct and support an argument, and, "the ability to present the past in clear ways, whether in writing or in other media, saying what can be said and not saying what cannot."

U.S. Standards for Historical Thinking in Schools
In the United States, the National Center for History in the Schools at the University of California, Los Angeles has developed history standards that include benchmarks for both content in U.S. and world history and historical thinking skills in grades Kindergarten-4 and 5-12. In both of these age ranges, the Center defines historical thinking in five parts:

 Chronological Thinking  
 Historical Comprehension 
 Historical Analysis and Interpretation 
 Historical Research Capabilities  
 Historical Issues-Analysis and Decision-Making

As part of the national assessment effort called “The Nation’s Report Card, ” the United States Department of Education has also developed benchmarks for student achievement in U.S. history. Their rubric divides history learning into three basic dimensions: major historical themes, chronological periods, and ways of knowing and thinking about history. The third dimension is further divided into two parts: historical knowledge and perspective, and historical analysis and interpretation.

The Role of History Textbooks in Learning to Think Historically
History textbooks draw much attention from history educators and educational researchers. The use of textbooks is nearly universal in history, government, and other social studies courses at the primary, and secondary levels in the U.S.; however, the role of textbooks remains controversial.

Arguments against reliance on textbooks have ranged from ideological to pragmatic. While textbooks are often presented as the objective truth, they are selected versions of a constructed past.

The creation and revision of textbooks can be a never-ending political process, with many groups fighting over the version of history they think should be presented as the truth to schoolchildren. For example, Texas history textbooks did not include slavery as a central cause of the Civil War until 2018, even though slavery has long been understood to be at the core of the Civil War. The debate continues––the Texas Freedom Network still thinks the revised curriculum "[does] not paint a full picture of civil rights movements in the United States," among other failings. The subjective process of choosing narratives to include in a history textbook can be seen in Marty Rowley's (a Republican member of the education board) comment on the controversy over Texas textbooks: "Public education is by nature public... our job is to make sure that the standards reflect what Texans want their children to be taught.”

Historical thinking has been suggested as a way to avoid presenting only one narrative as the truth. In response to the controversy over Texas textbooks, "Fritz Fischer, the chair of the history department at the University of Northern Colorado, said many of these problems could be solved if the school board prioritized making primary documents available to students, rather than deciding on which version of events ought to be taught."

Still other critics believe that using textbooks undermines the process of learning history by sacrificing thinking skills for content—that textbooks allow teachers to cover vast amounts of names, dates, and places while encouraging students simply to memorize instead of question or analyze. For example, Sam Wineburg argues: "Traditional history instruction constitutes a form of information, not a form of knowledge. Students might master an agreed-upon narrative, but they lacked any way of evaluating it, of deciding whether it, or any other narrative, was compelling or true” (41).

Most textbook critics concede that textbooks are a necessary tool in history education. Arguments for textbook-based curricula point out that history teachers require resources to support the broad scope of topics covered in the typical history classroom. Well-designed textbooks can provide a foundation on which enterprising educators can build other classroom activities.

Historical Thinking Teaching Models 
Models for historical thinking have been developed to better prepare educators in facilitating historical thinking literacies in students.

Benchmarks for Historical Thinking 
Peter Seixas,  Professor Emeritus from the University of British Columbia and creator of The Historical Thinking Project, outlines six benchmarks for historical thinking literacies in students. The benchmarks focus on developing the skills necessary for students to create an account of the past using primary source documents and narratives, or what Seixas terms "traces" and "accounts." Although these benchmarks provide a model to develop historical literacies, Seixas states that the concepts only can be applied with substantial content learning about the past.
 Establishing Historical Significance is the ability to identify what events, issues, and trends are historically significant and how they connect. Historical significance will vary over time and from group to group allowing for the criteria in deciding what to study to vary (e.g. Canadians will study Canadian history due to national connections).
 Using Primary Sources as Evidence is the ability to locate, choose, understand and provide context for the past using primary sources. This approach to reading a source will be dependent on the kind of source being used and the kind of information the user is trying to find (e.g. reading to a book for factual information)
 Identifying Continuity is the ability to understand how issues change  or stay the same over time and identify the change as progress or decline. Placing historical events in chronological order is a way of identifying continuity and the ability to group events into identifiable periods helps to better understand their interconnection.
 Analyze Case and Consequences is the ability to recognize how humans can cause change that impacts present day social, political and natural (e.g. geographic) issues. Seixas and Peck note that this benchmark requires understanding causes, or circumstances, that include "...long-term ideologies, institutions, and conditions, and short-term motivations, actions and events" that lead to particular consequences in history and affect present.
 Taking a Historical Perspective is the ability understand different social, cultural, intellectual, and emotional perspectives that formed the experiences and actions of people from the past.

 Understanding the Moral Dimension of History is the ability to learn about moral issues today by examining the past. This is an important step in historical literacy because it requires reserving present day moral judgments to understand actions from the past without approving of those actions.

SCIM-C Strategy 
Created by David Hicks, Peter E. Doolittle, E. Thomas Ewing, the SCIM-C strategy of historical thinking focuses on developing self-regulating practices when engaging in analyzing primary sources. The SCIM-C strategy focuses on the development of historical question to be answered when analyzing primary sources. This strategy provides a scaffold for students as they build more complex investigation and analysis practices identified in the "capstone stage".  The capstone stage in the SCIM-C model relies on students having analyzed a number of historical documents and having built some historical knowledge about the time, event, or issue being studied.
 Summarizing is the process of finding information using the primary source. This information can include the type of source (e.g. text, photograph), creator, subject, date it was created, and the opinion or perspective of the author.
 Contextualizing is the process of identifying when and in what context the primary source was created.  By placing the primary source in context the source can more easily be treated a historical document separate from contemporary morals, ethics, and values.
 Inferring is the ability to use the information gathered during the summarizing and contextualizing of a source to develop a greater understanding of the sub-text of a primary source. This stage relies on the ability to ask questions requiring inference on what is not stated directly in the source.
 Monitoring (Capstone Stage) is the ability to identify initial assumptions that may have been a part of the historical question asked. This stage requires an analysis of the original question and whether the historical information found has answered that question or whether more questions need to be considered.
 Corroborating is the final stage that can only occurs once several historical documents have been analyzed. This stage involves comparing evidence from a number of sources. This comparison includes looking for similarities and differences in perspectives, gaps in the information, and contradictions.

Resources
Kobrin, David. Beyond the Textbook: Teaching History Using Primary Sources. Portsmouth, NH: Heinemann, 1996.
Lesh, Bruce. "Why Won't You Just Tell Us the Answer?" Teaching Historical Thinking in Grades 7-12." Portsmouth,Stenhouse, 2011.
Loewen, James. Lies My Teacher Told Me: Everything Your American History Textbook Got Wrong. New York: Touchstone, 1995.
National Center for Education Statistics. National Assessment of Educational Progress: Nation’s Report Card. 2003. <> (last accessed 29 June 2004).
National Center for History in the Schools. National Standards for History. 1996. <> (last accessed 14 February 2011).
Stearns, P., Seixas, P, Wineburg, S (Eds.). Knowing, Teaching and Learning History: National and International Perspectives. New York: NYU Press, 2000.
Wineburg, Sam. Historical Thinking and Other Unnatural Acts. Philadelphia, PA: Temple University Press, 2001.
Wineburg, Sam, Martin, Daisy, Monte-Sano, Chauncey. Reading like a Historian: Teaching Literacy in Middle and High School Classrooms. New York: Teachers College Press, 2012.
National History Education Clearinghouse

References

Historiography